Konstantin Davidovsky was a Soviet male actor.

Selected filmography 
 1923 — Red Devils
 1926 — The Traitor

References

External links 
 Константин Давидовский on kino-teatr.ru

Soviet male film actors
1882 births
1939 deaths